Xenofon Panos (born 25 August 1989) is a Greek professional footballer who plays as a right-back for Gamma Ethniki club Kozani.

References

1989 births
Living people
Greek footballers
Association football defenders
Apollon Smyrnis F.C. players
Panachaiki F.C. players
Niki Volos F.C. players
Trikala F.C. players
A.O. Nea Ionia F.C. players
Kozani F.C. players
Footballers from Ioannina